Sander Gard Bolin Berge (born 14 February 1998) is a Norwegian professional footballer who plays as a midfielder for  club Sheffield United and the Norway national team. Berge is a product of Asker's youth academy.

Club career

Early career
Berge was born in Bærum, Viken. He started his career playing youth football for Asker Fotball, making his senior debut in the end of the 2013 season for the team then playing in the Norwegian 2. divisjon. He joined top flight team Vålerenga before the 2015 season. Berge made his league debut coming off the bench against Sandefjord on 11 July 2015 and his first league start against Rosenborg, quickly establishing himself as a key player for the club.

On 2 January 2017, he signed a four-year contract with K.R.C. Genk. He made his first team league debut on 21 January as a substitute in the 0–1 win away against Eupen. He earned his first start and full match against Royal Excel Mouscron on 17 February in a 1–0 win at home, becoming an integral part of the team for the remaining season, which included an impressive run in the Europa League, ending in the quarter finals against Celta Vigo.

Sheffield United
On 30 January 2020, Berge signed for Premier League club Sheffield United, becoming the club's record signing. He joined on a four-and-a-half year contract. On 2 July 2020, Berge scored his first goal for Sheffield United in a 3–1 win against Tottenham Hotspur.

International career
Berge made his debut for Norway when he played for the under-15 team against Canada U15 on 2 May 2013. He has since represented Norway at every level up to the senior national team. He made his senior international debut on 23 March 2017, aged 19, coming on as a substitute in the 76th minute of the Euro-qualifier against Northern Ireland.

On 5 September 2019, Berge scored his first senior international goal in the 34th minute of a game against Malta in the UEFA Euro 2020 qualifying rounds.

Personal life
Berge comes from a basketball-playing family, with his father, Swedish mother and older brother all having played basketball at international level. His brother has also played for top flight teams Centrum Tigers and Asker Aliens. Berge is also the grandson of Ragnar Berge, who played as a left-back for Vålerenga from 1945 until 1957, and was capped once by Norway (in 1955).

Career statistics

Club

International

As of match played 12 June 2022. Norway score listed first, score column indicates score after each Berge goal.

Honours
Genk
Belgian First Division A: 2018–19
Belgian Super Cup: 2019

References

External links
Profile at the Sheffield United F.C. website

1998 births
Living people
Sportspeople from Bærum
Norwegian footballers
Norway youth international footballers
Norway under-21 international footballers
Norway international footballers
Association football midfielders
Asker Fotball players
Vålerenga Fotball players
K.R.C. Genk players
Sheffield United F.C. players
Norwegian Third Division players
Norwegian Second Division players
Eliteserien players
Belgian Pro League players
Premier League players
Norwegian expatriate footballers
Expatriate footballers in Belgium
Expatriate footballers in England
Norwegian expatriate sportspeople in Belgium
Norwegian expatriate sportspeople in England
Norwegian people of Swedish descent